Büren is a sum of the Töv Province in Mongolia. The Bulangaa settlement (former  sum center) is  SE from Büren sum center.

Districts of Töv Province